Craig Fouhy is an American sports broadcaster and former football player and coach. He presently is the Sports Director and Sports Anchor for KNXV-TV in Phoenix, Arizona.

Playing career
Fouhy played college football at Pacific Lutheran from 1972 to 1975 as an offensive tackle under College Football Hall of Fame coach Frosty Westering.

Coaching career
Fouhy's coaching career spanned 13 seasons in high school football and six at the college level. Towards the end, he also had a two-year run as a middle school basketball coach.

Before entering the college coaching ranks as the assistant offensive line coach at the University of Montana in 1982, Fouhy spent six years as an assistant and head coach on the high school level in Washington, where he returned between his two one-year stints with the Grizzlies. From 1987 to 1988, he compiled a 1–17 record as head football coach of at North Park College—now known as North Park University—in Chicago, where he also coached the golf team.

Following his two-year tenure at North Park, Fouhy again returned to Washington, where he taught and coached basketball at Explorer Middle School from 1990–91 and coached football at Bothell High School in 1991. Prior to the 1991 season, Fouhy was named head coach of the Juanita High School football team, only to resign one week later.

During his six seasons as a high school head football coach in the state of Washington, Fouhy compiled a 16–38 (.296) record.

Broadcasting career
Fouhy was hired by KNXV-TV in Phoenix, Arizona, in 1998 after coaching high school and college football for 18 years and middle school basketball for two. He has also worked as a play-by-play announcer and color commentator for college football on television and radio.

Head coaching record

College

References

Year of birth missing (living people)
Living people
American football offensive tackles
College football announcers
Montana Grizzlies football coaches
North Park Vikings football coaches
Pacific Lutheran Lutes football players
College golf coaches in the United States
High school football coaches in Washington (state)